The Bungle Family is an American gag-a-day comic strip, created by Harry J. Tuthill, that first appeared in 1918. Originally titled Home, Sweet Home, it first appeared as part of a series of rotating strips in the New York Evening Mail. The strip ran until June 2, 1945.

In 1999, The Bungle Family was voted one of the Top 100 English language comics of the 20th Century by The Comics Journal. Art Spiegelman praised The Bungle Family as "Visually deadpan, genuinely hilarious once you tune into its frequency, with a great ear for dialogue and an unsurpassed sense of character". Spiegelman also described the
strip as "one of the darkest visions of American life this side of Nathanael West."

Publication history 

Seen only sporadically in 1918, the strip was published daily and was nationally syndicated with the McClure Newspaper Syndicate by the end of 1919. Home, Sweet Home followed the adventures of Mabel (later Josephine) and George, a young couple beset on all sides by in-laws, neighbors and businessmen.

Tuthill took the strip to the McNaught Syndicate when the Evening Mail was sold in 1924, changing the name to The Bungle Family and adding daughter Peggy Bungle to the cast. A Sunday page was in existence by September 9, 1923.

Tuthill continued to draw The Bungle Family for McNaught until he had a dispute with the syndicate in 1939. This led to Tuthill ending the strip  on August 1, 1942. After a hiatus, the strip returned — syndicated by Tuthill himself — on May 16, 1943, with newspapers running a promotional banner, "The Bungles Are Back!" It ran for two more years until June 2, 1945, when Tuthill retired.

The Bungle Family Sunday page had three different toppers during the run: Little Brother (Oct 24, 1926 - March 28, 1937), Another Day Shot (1936) and Short Stories (April 4, 1937 - 1938).

Characters and story
Called "the finest, most inventive and socially critical of the family strips" by comics historian Bill Blackbeard, The Bungle Family was a popular domestic comedy that emphasized dialogue and realistic situations. The titular patriarch of the strip, long-suffering, cantankerous George Bungle, voiced the petty frustrations and joys of the common man during the Jazz Age and through the Depression.

Comics historian Don Markstein described life among the Bungles:

In the mid-1930s, Tuthill serialized exotic adventures and introduced a large supporting cast over the next several years—moves that were accompanied by a huge surge of public interest in the strip. Around this time, Tuthill began incorporating fantasy and time travel into the strip.

Reprints
Reprints of the strip were first featured in the comic book Famous Funnies beginning with its first issue in 1934. In 2006, it was announced that Spec Publications, a Colorado-based publisher of classic comics, planned to reprint The Bungle Family in collected editions.

In 2014, The Library of American Comics published a year of The Bungle Family (1930) in their LoAC Essentials series.

References

Sources 

Home, Sweet Home. New York: M.S. Company, 1925.
 Waugh, Coulton, The Comics, MacMillan, 1947, 1991, p. 110-111.
 The Bungle Family: A Complete Compilation, 1928 / Harry J. Tuthill; introduction by Bill Blackbeard, The Hyperion library of classic American comic strips, Westport, Connecticut: Hyperion Press, 1977. LCCN 76053057 
 Hunter, Julius K., Westmoreland and Portland places: the history and architecture of America's Premier Private Streets, 1888-1988 (St. Louis, Missouri),  University of Missouri Press, Columbia, Missouri, 1988, p. 84.
 The Bungle Family 1930: LOAC Essentials Volume 5: Library of American Comics Essentials, Hardcover – July 15, 2014 / Harry J. Tuthill; IDW Publishing, 2014.

External links
Flickr
Lambiek: The Bungle Family
"The Press: Bungle". Time (August 18, 1930)
Modern Mechanix, October 1936 

1918 comics debuts
1945 comics endings
American comics characters
American comic strips
Comics about married people
Comics characters introduced in 1918
Fictional families
Gag-a-day comics